William Fargo Kip (8 April 1855 – 5 July 1905) was an American lawyer and legal librarian.

He was born in Buffalo, N Y, the second son of the late Henry Kip, a distinguished member of the Kip family of New York city. He was educated at Phillips Exeter Academy and at Harvard college, graduating in the class of 1876. He spent a year in travel abroad, and returned in 1877 to enter the Harvard law school, where he passed a year. The next year he entered the Columbia law school, and received the degree of LED in 1879. He practiced his profession in Buffalo from 1881 to 1891. During this period he was deeply interested in forwarding the cause of civil service reform, and was for some years civil service examiner for the city of Buffalo. 

He took an active part in politics, being a democrat, and was in 1892 a confidential secretary of Ex-President Cleveland. In 1891 he went to practice law in New York city. In 1896, after a competitive examination open to all lawyers, he was appointed assistant librarian of the appellate division of the New York supreme court, and in 1898 he was appointed the librarian of one of the most complete law libraries in the world, that of the bar association of the city of New York. In spite of his failing health, Kip made a high reputation in this post. 

He died unmarried in Provincetown. His brothers, Henry W. Kip of East Aurora. New York, and Charles H. Kip, a member of the Boston school board, survived him.
  

1855 births
1905 deaths
Harvard College alumni
Columbia Law School alumni
American lawyers
American librarians
Phillips Exeter Academy alumni